Anilicus is a genus of beetles in the click beetle family.

Description
Body is oblong, parallel-sided and flattened. These beetles are characterized by a bicolorous black and orange or red coloration.

Distribution 
They are endemic to Central and coastal eastern Australia and south-western Australia.

Species
 Anilicus attenuatus Candèze, 1863 
 Anilicus loricatus Candèze, 1863 
 Anilicus parvus Gullan, 1977 
 Anilicus rectilineatus Gullan, 1977 
 Anilicus semiflavus (Germar, 1844)
 Anilicus xanthomus (W.S. Macleay, 1826)

References

Elateridae genera
Elaterinae